The toponymies of places in New York's Capital District are a varied lot, from non-English languages such as Native American, Dutch, and German to places named for famous people or families, of either local or national fame.  Also, in the early 19th century, many places in the Hudson Valley, Capital District and points west were either named or renamed after places from Classical Antiquity (e.g. Athens, Cairo, Carthage, Greece, Ilion, Ithaca, Phoenicia, Rome, Syracuse, Troy, Utica)

Settlements

Notes

References

Sources

New York (state)-related lists
New York's Capital District
New York